Kyle Hardingham (born 1 September 1988) is a former professional Australian rules footballer who played for the Essendon Football Club in the Australian Football League (AFL).

Hardingham was selected by Essendon with the seventh pick in the 2010 AFL Pre-Season Draft. Originally from East Fremantle in the WAFL, he represented Western Australia in the state game against South Australia in 2009.

He made his AFL debut against North Melbourne in round 17 of the 2010 AFL season, kicking four goals, helping Essendon achieve an upset victory by 3 points. The following Friday night, he kicked two goals in a win against St Kilda.

Hardingham was delisted at the conclusion of the 2014 AFL season. He remained with Essendon as a VFL-listed player in its reserves team in 2016.

Hardingham, along with 33 other Essendon players, was found guilty of using a banned performance-enhancing substance, thymosin beta-4, as part of Essendon's sports supplements program during the 2012 season. He and his teammates were initially found not guilty in March 2015 by the AFL Anti-Doping Tribunal, but a guilty verdict was returned in January 2016 after an appeal by the World Anti-Doping Agency. He was suspended for two years which, with backdating, ended in November 2016; as a result, he served approximately fourteen months of his suspension and missed the entire 2016 season.

Following his suspension, Hardingham signed as a playing coach at Pascoe Vale in the Essendon District Football League (EDFL).

Statistics
 Statistics are correct to end of the 2012 season.

|- style="background-color: #EAEAEA" 
| 2010 ||  || 34 || 6 || 8 || 8 || 36 || 24 || 60 || 28 || 12 || 1.3 || 1.3 || 6.0 || 4.0 || 10.0 || 4.7 || 2.0
|-
| 2011 ||  || 34 || 22 || 1 || 0 || 213 || 118 || 331 || 112 || 41 || 0.0 || 0.0 || 9.7 || 5.4 || 15.0 || 5.1 || 1.9
|- style="background-color: #EAEAEA" 
| 2012 ||  || 34 || 21 || 0 || 0 || 162 || 90 || 252 || 82 || 36 || 0.0 || 0.0 || 7.7 || 4.3 || 12.0 || 3.9 || 1.7
|- class="sortbottom"
! colspan=3| Career
! 49
! 9
! 8
! 411
! 232
! 643
! 222
! 89
! 0.2
! 0.2
! 8.4
! 4.7
! 13.1
! 4.5
! 1.8
|}

References

External links

 Draft Profile on afl.com.au

Essendon Football Club players
Living people
1988 births
Australian rules footballers from Western Australia
People from Kojonup, Western Australia
East Fremantle Football Club players
Australian sportspeople in doping cases
Bendigo Football Club players
Pascoe Vale Football Club players
Australian rules football coaches